Christian Anthony Mathis (born June 28, 1973), better known by his stage name Trick Trick, is an American rapper and record producer from Detroit. He is a member of the hip hop group Goon Sqwad.

Early life 
Mathis was born on June 28, 1973 to George and Michelle Mathis in Detroit, Michigan. His brother, Kameel Mathis, is also a rapper who goes by the name Diezel.

Discography

Studio albums

Mixtapes

Singles

Guest appearances

Accolades 

!
|-
|align=center| 2007
|rowspan="2"| Himself
|Detroit Music Award for Outstanding Hip-Hop Artist/Group
|
|
|-
|align=center| 2020
|Detroit Music Award for Outstanding Rap Artist or Group
|
|
|-

References

External links

1973 births
Living people
Gangsta rappers
Rappers from Detroit
Midwest hip hop musicians
African-American male rappers
21st-century American rappers
American hip hop record producers
20th-century African-American people
21st-century American male musicians
21st-century African-American musicians